August Scherl (24 July 1849 – 18 April 1921) was a German newspaper magnate.

Career 
August Hugo Friedrich Scherl founded a newspaper and publishing concern on 1 October 1883, which from 1900 carried the name August Scherl Verlag. He was editor of the Berlin Local Advertiser (Berliner Lokal-Anzeiger) since 3 November 1883, and his publishing house started the weekly magazine Die Woche (The Week) in 1899. In 1904 he took over publication of the widely popular magazine Die Gartenlaube. As a result his publishing company had the largest circulation of any in Germany at the time.

In 1909 he developed a monorail system for Germany in his book A New Rapid Transit System. His expensive newspaper projects were not economically successful, so in 1913, Scherl informed Chancellor Bethmann-Hollweg that he was going to sell his company's shares. The company was eventually purchased by Baron Simon Alfred Franz Emil von Oppenheim and the Cologne financier Louis Hagen of Deutscher Verlagsverein with financing of 8 million marks. On February 5, 1914, Scherl resigned from the management, selling his shares in the German Publishers Association. 

His nationwide newspaper empire was taken over by Alfred Hugenberg in 1916, and later by Max Amann (Franz-Eher-Verlag).

The Generalanzeiger-Presse (General Advertiser Press) in Germany was founded by Scherl.

Publications by Scherl 
 1883: Berliner Lokal-Anzeiger 
 1889: Berliner Abendzeitung
 1894: Neueste Berliner Handels- und Börsennachrichten
 1895: Sport im Bild (first german sport illustrated)
 1898: Berlin has no theater audience! Suggestions for eliminating the abuses in our theater system
 1899: Die Woche
 1899: Sport im Wort
 1900: Der Tag
 1904: Die Gartenlaube
 1905: Praktischer Wegweiser, later as Allgemeiner Wegweiser
 1909: A new rapid transit system - suggestions for improving passenger transport
 1922: Berlin illustrated night edition
 1928: Thinking and Guessing

Personal Life
Scherl was born in Düsseldorf. As a boy, he lived with his parents in Naunynstrasse, but in later life he remained in the central district of Berlin. He died in Berlin and is buried at the Luisenstadt cemetery. He had a villa constructed in Dahlem in secret, in order to surprise his wife.  When she made a derogatory comment about the building, when driving past it, Scherl had the house demolished, without informing his wife.  The secret of his success was his readiness to take risks, understanding of economics, foresight, innovation and unwillingness to take anything on trust.

External links

References
 

1849 births
1921 deaths
19th-century German newspaper publishers (people)
20th-century German newspaper publishers (people)
German newspaper chain founders
Businesspeople from Düsseldorf
Businesspeople from Berlin